The 60th Tank Battalion "M.O. Locatelli" is an inactive tank battalion of the Italian Army based in Altamura in Apulia. Originally the battalion, like all Italian tank units, was part of the infantry, but since 1 June 1999 it is part of the cavalry. Operationally the battalion was last assigned to the Armored Brigade "Pinerolo".

History 
The battalion was formed during the 1975 army reform: on 1 November 1975 the LX Armored Battalion of the Infantry Brigade "Pinerolo" was renamed 60th Armored Battalion "M.O. Locatelli". The 60th Locatelli was granted a new flag on 12 November 1976 by decree 846 of the President of the Italian Republic Giovanni Leone. The battalion received the traditions of the LX Tank Battalion "L", which had been formed by the XX Tank Battalion "L" in Italian Libya in December 1939. Equipped with L3/35 tankettes the LX battalion fought in the early stages of the Western Desert Campaign and was destroyed during the Battle of Sidi Barrani near Buq Buq by the British Western Desert Force.

After World War II the LX Armored Battalion was reformed on 1 May 1960 as armored unit of the Infantry Brigade "Avellino". The Avellino was disbanded on 30 October 1965 and the LX battalion was transferred to the Infantry Brigade "Pinerolo".

Tank and armored battalions created during the 1975 army reform were all named for officers, soldiers and partisans, who were posthumously awarded Italy's highest military honor the Gold Medal of Military Valour for heroism during World War II. The 60th Tank Battalion's name commemorated 4th Tank Infantry Regiment Lieutenant Giuseppe Locatelli, who had served in the I Tank Battalion "M" during the Italian invasion of Egypt and was killed in action on 19 November 1940 south of Sidi Barrani. Equipped with M47 Patton tanks and M113 armored personnel carriers the battalion joined the Motorized Brigade "Pinerolo".

On 1 February 1979 the 60th Armored Battalion "M.O. Locatelli" ceded its two M113 armored personnel carrier equipped companies to the infantry battalions of the brigade and received two new tank companies. Consequently, the battalion was renamed on the same date 60th Tank Battalion "M.O. Locatelli". Additionally the battalion was equipped with modern Leopard 1A2 tanks and the brigade's infantry battalions were equipped with VCC-1 armored personnel carriers. Therefore, on 1 February 1979 the brigade was renamed Mechanized Brigade "Pinerolo".

On 17 October 1992 the 60th Tank Battalion "M.O. Locatelli" was renamed 133rd Tank Regiment without changing size or composition. On 9 October 1995 the 31st Tank Regiment in Bellinzago Novarese received the flag and name of the 4th Tank Regiment and transferred its own name and flag to the 133rd Tank Regiment in Altamura, while on the same date the flag of the 133rd Tank Regiment was transferred to the army's Tank School in Lecce, where it was stored in the commander's office, until, in case of war, the personnel of the Cavalry School would have formed the 133rd Tank Regiment. On 3 December 1996 the Pinerolo, which fielded now two tank regiments, was renamed: Armored Brigade "Pinerolo".

In fall 2001 the 133rd Tank Regiment was disbanded and its flag transferred to the Shrine of the Flags in the Vittoriano in Rome.

See also 
 Mechanized Brigade "Pinerolo"

References

Tank Battalions of Italy